Khalaf Beygluy-e Olya (also Romanized as Khalaf Beyglūy-e ‘Olyā; also known as Khalaf Beyglū-ye Bālā and Khalaf Beyglū-ye ‘Olyā) is a village in Garamduz Rural District, Garamduz District, Khoda Afarin County, East Azerbaijan Province, Iran. At the 2006 census, its population was 392, in 86 families.

References 

Populated places in Khoda Afarin County